The Casona de la Universidad Nacional Mayor de San Marcos, also known as Cultural Center of the National University of San Marcos, is a large Colonial building in the city of Lima, Lima Region, Peru, where the main cultural center of the University of San Marcos operates. It currently houses various entities of importance to the university institution as a whole, such as: the Museum of Art, the Museum of Archeology and Anthropology, the University Theater of San Marcos (TUSM), the España de las Artes Library and the directions of Ballet, Folklore, Music, Film and Television, Band and Orchestra, and Tourism. The set of the "Casona de la Universidad de San Marcos" -which includes the famous "University Park" on its outside-, of undeniable historical and cultural importance for the city, it is part of the area and of the list of buildings of the historic center of Lima that were recognized as a World Heritage Site by UNESCO, in 1988.

La Casona de San Marcos is one of the most important buildings of Lima, both from the historical and architectural point of view.

Located in the old building of the Noviciado de San Antonio Abad and of the Real Convictorio de San Carlos, and popularly known under the name of Casona de San Marcos, it is the oldest of the seats currently occupied by the University and one of the most important non-religious historical buildings in the city of Lima. Founded as a Jesuit novitiate, it became the university's headquarters between 1875 and 1966, when most of its administrative offices were moved to the campus of the University City. The Casona de San Marcos is the main reference of the cultural and artistic activity of the university, and one of the best preserved constructions of the colonial era in Lima.

History of the building 

The history of the Casona begins the year 1605, when Antonio Correa Ureña gives the Jesuits an important donation for the construction of their novitiate, built to educate and train the new members of the Society of Jesus. At this time, the dimensions of the novitiate that was called that of San Antonio Abad, was five or even six times larger than the current size of La Casona. After being partially destructed by the earthquake of 1746 the Jesuits rebuilt it again, with a new design, completing the current building. In 1767 three years after the expulsion of the Jesuit order, Viceroy of Peru Manuel d'Amat i de Junyent founded the Real Convictorio de San Carlos, a type of university, in the former ecclesiastical building, in honor to the Bourbon King Charles III of Spain. This college reached great apogee from the end-18th century until 19th century.

After the proclamation of the independence, in 1821, the college continues its work with an almost complete autonomy with respect to the University of San Marcos, until in 1867 it decrees the inclusion of the college of San Carlos and of the Independencia (San Fernando) into it.

Since the transfer of the university, La Casona remained a place of great historical value and importance not only for the university but for the city of Lima. Since the Casona suffered a damage caused by the earthquake of 1966, the university was transferred to the new University City, its current main headquarters. So the set of La Casona were enabled to lodge the institutions of cultural extension of the university.

In 1989, the National University of San Marcos, the Spanish Agency for International Cooperation and the National Institute of Culture signed a cooperation agreement Peru-Spain to restore the architectural set and to be dedicated to culture, research and artistic creations. The works were carried out with the economic and technical support of the Spanish Cooperation.

At present, the Casona houses the San Marcos Cultural Center, which offers cultural extension courses, exhibitions and is home to several university museums and research centers. Inside La Casona highlights the Hall of Degrees (old Chapel of Loreto), where the official ceremonies of the doctorates "honoris cause" that the university grants are realized; the General Hall and the courts of Law, that of Letters, that of Sciences, that of the Jasmines and that of Boys.

Also currently houses the Museum of Art of the University of San Marcos.

Description

Halls

Chapel of Nuestra Señora de Loreto

The Chapel of Nuestra Señora de Loreto, also called Hall of Degrees of Literature, is located between the courtyards of Literature and Jasmines. This is one of the most beautiful environments that has the old Casona de San Marcos.

Its vault has thirteen beautiful paintings from the mid-18th century, inspired by saints and doctors of the Church like St. Augustine, St. Thomas Aquinas and others.

General Hall
In front of the Courtyard of the Jasmines is the Salón General (General Hall), formed by courtroom, stands and wooden galleries, dating from the late-18th century. In this room of debates and controversies, the most important ceremonies of the University are currently held, such as graduations, solemn sessions and seminars.

Courtyards

At the early-20th century, the Casona de San Marcos had of five main cloisters. The Law Faculty worked in the Courtyard los Maestros, which is the main one and has in the center a carved sculpture, mute witness to innumerable historical events and symbol of the University that appears in the current bills of 20 nuevos soles.

The Courtyard of los Naranjos was occupied by the Arts and Education Faculty; the Courtyard of los Chicos, by the Faculty of Sciences, Chemistry and Physics; and the Courtyard of los Jasmines, by the Faculty of Jurisprudence. The fifth patio faced the garden.

Location
Nicolás de Piérola Avenue 1222 - University Park, Lima.

See also

List of buildings in Lima
National University of San Marcos
University City of the National University of San Marcos

References

External links 
Official website of the Cultural Center of the University of San Marcos
 Official website of the National University of San Marcos

National University of San Marcos
Buildings and structures in Lima
Roman Catholic churches completed in 1746
Educational institutions established in 1767
Baroque palaces in Peru
Rococo architecture in Peru
1605 establishments in the Spanish Empire
Cultural centers in Peru
18th-century Roman Catholic church buildings in Peru
Cultural heritage of Peru